The Harvest soundtrack to the 1993 movie of the same name was played by Dave Allen and Rick Boston and released under the name "The Crash Baptists". The song "One by One" features Belinda Carlisle; World Domination Recordings labelmates Sky Cries Mary contribute "The Elephant Song"; and two tracks are credited to Low Pop Suicide. Since Boston and Allen were founding members of that band, this record can be considered its side project. The record, considered first in Allen's plan to release a series of twenty, was produced by Michael Vail Blum.

Thriller film soundtracks
1996 soundtrack albums